S. polyclada may refer to:

 Schefflera polyclada, a plant endemic to Papua New Guinea
 Scorzonera polyclada, a flowering plant